The 2023–24 Arizona Wildcats men's basketball team will represent the University of Arizona during the 2023–24 NCAA Division I men's basketball season. The team will be led by Tommy Lloyd, in his 3rd season as a head coach. It will be the Wildcats' 50th season at the on-campus McKale Center in Tucson, Arizona and 45th season as a member of the Pac-12 Conference.

Previous season

Season outlook
Heading into the 2022–23 season, Arizona followed up the first season under head coach Tommy Lloyd by being ranked 17th in the AP Preseason Poll & 13th in the USA Today Coaches Poll.  They had three players; Bennedict Mathurin, Dalen Terry & Christian Koloko drafted in the 2022 NBA Draft.

In Lloyd's second season, The Wildcats finished the 2022–23 season at 28–7, 14–6 in conference play.  They finished tied for 2nd in the Pac-12 regular season.  They finished non-conference play with a 12–1 record.  Arizona went 15–2 at home, 6–3 on the road, and 7–1 at neutral sites.  During the season, Arizona participated in the Maui Invitational in Maui, HI.  Arizona defeated Cincinnati, No. 17 San Diego State and No. 10 Creighton to win their 3rd overall Maui Invitational title.  Arizona also defeated No. 14 Indiana at the Las Vegas Clash in Las Vegas, NV.  Arizona also finished a home & home series against No. 6 Tennessee beating them 75–70.

Pac-12 tournament
Arizona entered the Pac-12 tournament as a #2-seed, They faced off against #10-seed Stanford, defeated 95–84 in the quarterfinals. They faced off against in-state rival #4-seed Arizona State, defeated 78–55 in the semifinals. They faced off against #1-seed UCLA defeated 61–59 in the title game to win their 9th conference tournament title in Paradise, Nevada.

NCAA tournament
Arizona entered the NCAA tournament as a #2-seed (South Region), facing off against #15-seed Princeton, which Arizona lost 55–59.

Offseason

Returning players

Departures
Due to COVID-19, the NCAA ruled in October 2020 that the 2020–21 season would not count against the eligibility of any basketball player, thus giving all players the option to return in 2022–23. Additionally, any players who have declared for the 2023 NBA draft—including seniors, who must opt into this year's draft—have the option to return if they make a timely withdrawal from the draft and end any pre-draft relationships with agents. Thus, separate lists will initially be maintained for confirmed and potential departures.

Coaching staff departures

Outgoing Transfers

Acquisitions

Incoming Transfers

2023 recruiting class

2024 recruiting class

Coaching staff additions

2023 NBA draft

Preseason

Preseason rankings
October – Pac-12 Men's Basketball Media Day in Las Vegas.

Source:

Preseason All-conference teams

Source:

Award watch lists
Listed in the order that they were released

Red and Blue game 
The annual Red-Blue game will take  place at McKale Center in the Fall.

Personnel

Roster
Note: Players' year is based on remaining eligibility. The NCAA did not count the 2020–21 season towards eligibility.

 
 

 
 

 
  

 

Source:

Support staff

Schedule
Arizona had previously announced an 8-year agreement with in-state rival NAU through the 2030 season, but was put on hold with Coach Lloyd's son Liam being a member of the NAU team. The Pac-12 announced a conference educational and scheduling partnership with the SWAC, with six schools holding a two-year home-and-home series and Arizona will travel to the Southern in the 2023–24 season.  Arizona announced a home-and-home series, starting in 2023–24 against Duke on November 10, 2023, with the first game of the series being played at Cameron Indoor Stadium in Durham, North Carolina.  Arizona and Duke previous played a home-and-home series in 1990 & 1991.
Arizona will not played against UCLA at home and Oregon State on the road.

|-
!colspan=12 style=| Exhibition

|-
!colspan=12 style=| Regular season

|-
!colspan=12 style=| Pac-12 Tournament

Source:

Game Summaries
This section will be filled in as the season progresses. 

Source:

TBD (exhibition)

at Southern

at Duke

USC

at Oregon

Arizona State

at Arizona State

California

at California

Colorado

at Colorado

Oregon

Oregon State

Stanford

at Stanford

at UCLA

at USC

Utah

at Utah

Washington

at Washington

Washington State

at Washington State

Statistics
Updated through

Team total per game

Player Statistics

Season highs

Players 
Points: 
Field goals: 
Field Goal Attempts: 
3 Point Field goals Made: 
3 Point Field goals Attempts:
Free Throws: 
Free Throws Attempts: 
Rebounds: 
Assists: 
Steals: 
Blocks: 
Minutes: 
Turnovers: 
Fouls:

Team 
Points: 
Field goals: 
Field Goal Attempts: 
3 Point Field goals Made: 
3 Point Field goals Attempts: 
Free throws Made: 
Free throws Attempts: 
Rebounds: 
Assists: 
Steals: 
Blocked Shots: 
Turnovers: 
Fouls:

Awards and honors

Midseason awards watchlists

Final awards watchlists

Postseason

National awards

Sources:

Rankings

*AP does not release post-NCAA Tournament rankings

Media coverage

Radio
ESPN Tucson - 1490 AM & 104.09 FM (ESPN Radio) and Nationwide - Dish Network, Sirius XM, Varsity Network and iHeartRadio)
KCUB 1290 AM – Football Radio Show – (Tucson, AZ)
KHYT – 107.5 FM (Tucson, AZ)
KTKT 990 AM – La Hora de Los Gatos (Spanish) – (Tucson, AZ)
KGME 910 AM – (IMG Sports Network) – (Phoenix, AZ)
KTAN 1420 AM – (Sierra Vista, AZ)
KDAP 96.5 FM (Douglas, Arizona)
KWRQ 102.3 FM – (Safford, AZ/Thatcher, AZ)
KIKO 1340 AM – (Globe, AZ)
KVWM 970 AM – (Show Low, AZ/Pinetop-Lakeside, AZ)
XENY 760 – (Nogales, Sonora) (Spanish)
KTZR (1450 AM) - (FoxSports 1450) - (Tucson, AZ)

TV
CBS Family – KOLD (CBS), CBSN 
ABC/ESPN Family – KGUN (ABC), ABC, ESPN, ESPN2, ESPNU, ESPN+, 
FOX Family – KMSB (FOX), FOX/FS1, FSN 
Pac-12 Network (Pac-12 Arizona)
NBC Family – KVOA, NBC Sports, NBCSN
PBS - KUAT
Univision - KUVE (Spanish) 
Telemundo - KHRR (Spanish)

See also

2023–24 Arizona Wildcats women's basketball team

Notes

References

Arizona Wildcats men's basketball seasons
Arizona
Arizona Wildcats men's basketball
Arizona Wildcats men's basketball